Crella elegans is a species of marine demosponges in the family Crellidae found in the Adriatic. It is the type species of its genus. It is the host of the ectoparasitic copepod Cryptopontius capitalis.

References

External links
 Crella (Crella) elegans at World Register of Marine Species (WoRMS)

Poecilosclerida
Animals described in 1862